Anare Qiodravu Rawaico (born 8 February 1977, in Suva) is a Fijian rugby union player. His position is as a prop.

Career
Qiodravu played for Waikato University, in New Zealand, moving then to France, first playing at FC Auch (2005–2006), and for RC Orléans, since 2006. He was first capped for Fiji, in a 37-21 win over the USA, on 30 June 2000. After a six-year absence, Qiodravu returned to his national side, being selected for the 2007 Rugby World Cup finals, where he played in all five games. He has been absent from the Fijian team since. Qiodravu currently holds 18 caps for his national side.

References

External links
Fiji profile
Scrum profile

1977 births
Living people
Fijian rugby union players
Rugby union props
Fiji international rugby union players
Fijian expatriate rugby union players
Expatriate rugby union players in France
Fijian expatriate sportspeople in France
Sportspeople from Suva
I-Taukei Fijian people